Mohammad Arif Noorzai (born 1959) was a former minister of Border and Tribe Affairs for Afghanistan.  He was elected to represent Kandahar Province in Afghanistan's Wolesi Jirga, the lower house of its National Legislature, in 2005. He is the first deputy speaker of Afghanistan Wolesi Jirga and his current position is the Advisor of President Hamid Karzai for security and tribal affairs
He is a member of the Pashtun ethnic group, and the Noorzai tribe.
A report on Kandahar prepared at the Navy Postgraduate School stated he is first deputy speaker, and that he is related to President Hamid Karzai through marriage, and that he is a high school graduate.

Early life 
Mohammad Arif Khan Noorzai  محمد عارف خان نورزی was born in 1959 at Kandahar province of Afghanistan. Whilst going to school at the province during his early life, he studied Faculty of Agriculture at Kabul University but was unable to complete his studies due to the Soviet invasion of Afghanistan. His family moved during the war towards Pakistan where they settled before returning to Afghanistan soon after.

References 

Energy ministers of Afghanistan
Water ministers of Afghanistan
Politicians of Kandahar Province
Living people
Members of the House of the People (Afghanistan)
1959 births